The 2008–09 Morehead State Eagles men's basketball team represented Morehead State University in the 2008–09 NCAA Division I men's basketball season. The Eagles, led by head coach Donnie Tyndall, played their home games at Ellis Johnson Arena in Morehead, Kentucky, as members of the Ohio Valley Conference. The Eagles won the 2009 OVC tournament, earning an automatic bid to the NCAA tournament as a 16th seed in the Midwest region. Morehead State played in the Opening Round game, defeating Alabama 58–43 for the school's first NCAA tournament win since 1984. Their run ended in the following round, losing to top seed Louisville.

Roster 

Source

Schedule and results

|-
!colspan=12 style=|Regular season

|-
!colspan=12 style=| Ohio Valley Conference tournament

|-
!colspan=12 style=| NCAA tournament

Source

References

Morehead State Eagles men's basketball seasons
Morehead State
Morehead State
Morehead State Eagles men's basketball
Morehead State Eagles men's basketball